Colobini is a tribe of Old World monkeys that includes all of the black-and-white colobus, red colobus, and olive colobus monkeys.

Classification 

 Family Cercopithecidae
 Subfamily Cercopithecinae
 Subfamily Colobinae
 Tribe Colobini
 Genus Colobus - black-and-white colobus monkeys
 Genus Piliocolobus - red colobus monkeys
 Genus Procolobus - olive colobus
 Genus Cercopithecoides
 Tribe Presbytini
 Langur (leaf monkey) group
 Odd-nosed group

References 

 
Mammal tribes
Taxa named by Thomas C. Jerdon
Taxa described in 1867